Joshua Patrick Allen (born May 21, 1996) is an American football quarterback for the Buffalo Bills of the National Football League (NFL). Allen played college football at Wyoming, where he was a bowl game MVP and was selected seventh overall by the Bills in the 2018 NFL Draft.

Allen had a breakout season in 2020 when he led the Bills to their first division title and playoff victory since 1995 en route to an AFC Championship Game appearance. He also set the Bills franchise records for single-season passing yards and touchdowns, while earning Pro Bowl and second-team All-Pro honors. Allen brought the Bills to consecutive division titles the following two years, the franchise's first since 1991, in addition to also breaking several other franchise and league-wide records for passing and quarterback rushing statistics.

Early years
His family has lived in the area since his great-grandfather, who emigrated from Sweden in 1907, settled there during the Great Depression. The farm where he was raised was established in 1975 by his paternal grandfather, who was also a longtime member of the local school board and namesake of the gymnasium of Firebaugh High School, from which Allen graduated in 2014.

Growing up as a Fresno State fan who regularly attended both games and football camps, Allen tried to draw the interest of the program's coaching staff; his father tried to sell the Bulldogs' head coach at the time, Tim DeRuyter, on him, but DeRuyter chose not to offer a scholarship. DeRuyter was not alone in this assessment; Allen received no scholarship offers from any NCAA Division I program—whether in the top-level FBS or second-tier FCS. San Diego State made him an offer to walk on, but Allen turned it down because Aztecs coach Rocky Long couldn't guarantee any playing time. In a 2017 story on Allen, ESPN journalist Mark Schlabach speculated on why Allen got so little interest out of high school:
At the time, Josh was about 6-foot-3 and 180 pounds. He hadn't attended the elite quarterback camps and wasn't a widely known prospect. His high school team didn't participate in many 7-on-7 camps because Josh and many of his teammates were busy playing baseball and other sports. He was the leading scorer on his basketball team and also pitched on the baseball team, reaching 90 mph with his fastball. Yahoo Sports writer Jeff Eisenberg added in another 2017 story:At a time when many scholarship-hungry families encourage their kids to specialize in one sport or to transfer to the school that will provide the most exposure, the Allens resisted both trends. They spurned overtures from more prominent Central Valley programs after Allen's breakout junior season and kept him at Firebaugh, living by the family mantra that "you bloom where you’re planted." Not only was Allen involved in multiple sports while in high school, he also regularly worked on the family farm and at the restaurant his mother operated in Firebaugh.

Allen was a member of the National FFA Organization through his local chapter at Firebaugh High School. Allen received numerous awards for his agricultural work and knowledge including a rank in the top four in the nation in diversified crop production of cantaloupe, cotton, and wheat in 2014.

College career

Reedley College
Allen attended Reedley College, a junior college where one of the football assistant coaches at the time was married to Allen's cousin.

In his only season with Reedley College, Allen led an offense that averaged 452.2 yards of total offense per game to rank No. 9 among all California junior-college teams in total offense. Reedley averaged 285.3 passing yards per game to rank No. 7 among all California junior colleges, scored 39.4 points per game to rank No. 10 in the state, and averaged 166.9 yards rushing to rank 26th. Individually, Allen's 26 touchdown passes tied him for No. 7 among all California junior-college quarterbacks in 2014. He also ranked 20th among California JUCO quarterbacks in passing yards as a freshman, and ranked 42nd in the state in rushing, averaging 66.0 yards per game.

Allen did not play in the team's first three games in 2014, but in the next game he ran for four touchdowns after coming off the bench, and soon became the team's starter, throwing for 25 touchdowns with only 4 interceptions for the rest of the season. By then, he had grown to 6'5" and 210 pounds (1.96 m, 95 kg), and his coaches at Reedley thought that he would soon receive many FBS scholarship offers. This proved incorrect; near the end of the season, Allen sent a mass email to every head coach, offensive coordinator, defensive coordinator, and quarterback coach in FBS, but received interest from only a small number of schools. Only Eastern Michigan and Wyoming offered him a scholarship, and Eastern Michigan withdrew its offer when Allen visited Wyoming late in the 2014–15 junior-college signing period.

Wyoming's coaches initially visited Reedley to scout another potential transfer, but former Fresno State assistant Dave Brown, who had since become part of the inaugural staff of new Wyoming Cowboys head coach Craig Bohl, was familiar with Allen, and urged offensive coordinator Brent Vigen to recruit him. While researching Allen, Vigen noticed a large number of parallels between Allen and a quarterback whom he had recruited in 2010 while serving in the same role at North Dakota State—Carson Wentz, who went on to become a starting quarterback for the Philadelphia Eagles. Wentz was similar in size to Allen, and also shared Allen's small-town, multi-sport, and late-blooming background.

Bohl soon warmed to Allen as a prospect, especially after their initial quarterback prospect committed to Syracuse. Bohl was the only FBS head coach to visit the family farm, and while there, he told Allen's father, "We went all around the country and there's only one quarterback we want and that's your son. He's going to be the face of our program." Despite receiving an offer from Wyoming, Allen made one final pitch to Fresno State's staff, sending a pointed email to an assistant referencing the fact that the team had received a commitment from a quarterback prospect who was both shorter and lighter than Allen was when Fresno State turned him down in high school. After being rebuffed, he committed to Wyoming, enrolling there prior to the 2015 season.

University of Wyoming

In his first year at Wyoming, he played in two games and made one start. In his first career start he attempted only four passes before suffering a broken collarbone which ended his season; because the injury occurred early in the season, he qualified for a medical redshirt. Allen returned from the injury in 2016 and was Wyoming's starter.

After throwing for over 3,200 yards and 28 touchdowns in 2016, he contemplated declaring for the 2017 NFL Draft, initially telling his family, girlfriend, and a few friends that he would turn pro. Shortly before the deadline to declare for the draft, Vigen called Allen's father to explain why he should stay at Wyoming an extra year; according to Eisenberg, "When Joel Allen got off the phone and entered his son’s room, he found his son riddled with anxiety about his decision." Before the draft declaration deadline, Bohl told Allen that staying in school one more year would improve his long-term NFL prospects, and Allen also sought advice from Wentz, who told him that in the NFL, he would have many league veterans depending on him to "win games and help secure their jobs." Allen ultimately remained at Wyoming. He threw for 1,812 yards, 16 touchdowns, and six interceptions in 2017.

College statistics

Professional career
Shortly after the completion of the 2017 NFL Draft, ESPN reporter Adam Schefter said about Allen's NFL prospects, "There was one personnel director who told me this week that you can put in the books, Josh Allen will be the No. 1 pick in the NFL draft next year." In December 2017, after leading the 8–5 Cowboys to a 37–14 win over Central Michigan in the 2017 Famous Idaho Potato Bowl, Allen announced he would be entering the 2018 NFL Draft. In his first mock draft in January 2018, ESPN draft analyst Mel Kiper Jr. predicted that the Cleveland Browns would select Allen over other top quarterbacks in the 2018 draft, such as Josh Rosen, Sam Darnold, Baker Mayfield, and Lamar Jackson.

On the day of the draft, old Twitter posts of his in which Allen used racial and homophobic slurs when he was in high school, were brought up. He apologized, stating that he was "young and dumb" for making them.

The Buffalo Bills drafted Allen as the seventh overall pick in the draft, trading up from 12th overall with the Tampa Bay Buccaneers to make the selection. On July 25, he signed a four-year, fully guaranteed $21 million contract with the Bills.

2018 season

Allen competed for the starting quarterback position with A. J. McCarron and Nathan Peterman through the offseason and training camp. Despite a quality preseason, Allen started the season as the backup to Peterman after McCarron was traded to the Oakland Raiders.

On September 9, 2018, Allen made his first regular season appearance against the Baltimore Ravens after Peterman was benched after posting a 0.0 passer rating. Allen finished with 74 passing yards and 26 rushing yards as the Bills lost 47–3. On September 12, the Bills announced that Allen would start the following week against the Los Angeles Chargers. Allen finished with 245 passing yards, his first NFL passing touchdown, which went to Kelvin Benjamin, and two interceptions as the Bills lost 20–31. He also rushed for 32 yards. Allen's 57-yard completion to Zay Jones, which traveled 64 yards, tied for the second longest air distance ever recorded by NFL Next Gen Stats for a completed pass.

During a Week 3 matchup against the Minnesota Vikings, Allen led the Bills to their first victory of the season with a dominant first-half performance. Allen passed for 196 yards and a touchdown, adding 39 yards on the ground with two rushing touchdowns in a 27–6 victory. In particular, he hurdled over Vikings linebacker Anthony Barr on one of his scrambles to pick up a first down, a play that went viral on social media.

During Week 5 against the Tennessee Titans, Allen completed 10 of 19 passes for 82 passing yards and an interception in the 13–12 win, adding another rushing touchdown. The following week, in a 20–13 loss to the Houston Texans, Allen suffered an elbow injury and did not return. He finished the game completing 10 of 17 passes for 84 passing yards and 20 rushing yards. He was expected to miss at least two games with the injury.

Allen returned after missing four games, getting the start against the Jacksonville Jaguars, which was noteworthy as Jaguars cornerback Jalen Ramsey had called Allen "trash" prior to the season. In a back-and-forth game that saw the Bills win 24–21 over the Jaguars, Allen completed 8 of 19 passes for 160 yards and a touchdown, adding 99 yards on the ground and a rushing touchdown on 13 rushes. The 99 rushing yards broke the Bills franchise record for rushing yards in a game by a quarterback, previously held by Tyrod Taylor. Despite a 21–17 loss to the Dolphins the following week, Allen threw for 235 yards and two touchdowns and added 135 yards on the ground (averaging 15.0 yards per pass attempt). During a game against the New York Jets and fellow rookie quarterback Sam Darnold in Week 14, Allen finished with 206 passing yards and 2 interceptions, adding a rushing touchdown on 101 rushing yards as the Bills lost a close game 23–27. Allen became the first quarterback in NFL history with at least 95 yards rushing in a three-week span, accumulating 335 yards.

After a 24–12 loss to the New England Patriots in Week 16, Allen rebounded in the rematch against the Dolphins in Week 17. Despite throwing his first career pick-six, he scored five total touchdowns, three passing and two rushing, along with 224 passing yards and 95 rushing yards as the Bills routed the Dolphins 42–17. The performance earned him recognition as the AFC's Offensive Player of the Week. The Bills finished 6–10 on the season, 5–6 with Allen as the starting quarterback. He became the first quarterback in Bills history to lead the team in both passing and rushing in a season. He led all quarterbacks with eight rushing touchdowns on the season, but also had the lowest completion percentage at 52.8.

2019 season

Allen entered 2019 as the Bills' opening day starter, being named a team captain. On September 8, 2019, Allen led the Bills to a comeback win over the New York Jets in week 1. Despite the Bills being down 16–0 at one point in the third quarter, Allen led the team to 17 unanswered points.  He finished the game with 254 passing yards on 24 completions, both career highs. He also had one passing touchdown, one rushing touchdown, and two interceptions. After leading Buffalo to its first 3–0 start since 2011, Allen struggled against a stout New England Patriots defense, throwing three interceptions, but became the first player to score an offensive touchdown on the Patriots in the 2019 season. He completed 13 of 28 passes for 153 yards, and also rushed for 26 yards and the aforementioned touchdown before suffering a helmet-to-helmet hit from Patriots cornerback Jonathan Jones, which forced him out of the eventual 16–10 Bills loss.

Despite being placed in the concussion protocol, Allen returned the following week against the Tennessee Titans, completing 23 of 32 pass attempts for 219 yards, two touchdowns, and one interception in a 14–7 Bills win. In Week 10 against the Cleveland Browns, Allen completed 22 of 41 passes for 266 yards and ran for 28 yards and two touchdowns, but the Bills lost 19–16 because of two missed field goal attempts. The following week against the Miami Dolphins, he passed for 256 yards and three touchdowns, matching a career high, and rushed for 56 yards and a touchdown as the Bills won 37–20. He was named AFC Offensive Player of the Week for his performance in Week 11. Against the Dallas Cowboys on Thanksgiving in week 13, Allen completed 19 of 24 passes for 231 yards and a touchdown with a passer rating of 120.7, also rushing for 43 yards and a touchdown in a 26–15 Bills win.

In Week 15 against the Pittsburgh Steelers on Sunday Night Football, Allen threw for 139 yards, one touchdown, and one interception and rushed for 28 yards and a touchdown during the 17–10 win. As a result of the win, the Bills clinched a spot in the playoffs. In the rematch against the Patriots in Week 16, Allen passed for 208 yards and two touchdowns, including a 53-yarder to John Brown, but Buffalo fell short once again, losing 24–17 to surrender the division title to New England. With playoff seeding locked up, Allen had a limited role in the regular season finale loss to the New York Jets. He finished the 2019 season with 3,089 passing yards, 20 passing touchdowns, and nine interceptions to go along with 109 carries for 510 rushing yards and nine rushing touchdowns, while also leading the league with four fourth quarter comebacks and five game-winning drives. However, he also posted the league's lowest completion percentage for a second consecutive year at 58.8.

2019–20 postseason
In the AFC Wild Card Round against the Houston Texans, Allen started strong, breaking Jim Kelly's franchise post-season record for rushing yards by a quarterback (37) with a single 42-yard run on the first drive, and caught a 16-yard touchdown pass from wide receiver John Brown on a trick play, similar to what Nick Foles did in Super Bowl LII. After building a 16–0 lead early in the third quarter, the Bills were unable to keep momentum and ultimately had to come from behind in the final moments to force overtime. Overall, Allen finished with 92 rushing yards, 264 passing yards, 16 receiving yards, and one total touchdown as the Bills lost 19–22 in overtime. Allen was just the third player since 1975 with 250+ pass yards, 40+ rush yards, and 15+ receiving yards in a single game.

2020 season

In August 2020, Allen was reportedly among a group of 77 NFL players that tested positive for COVID-19. However, all 77 results were later revealed to have been false positives due to mishandling by the laboratory that performed the testing. Allen remarked that he was frustrated by the error.

Allen started the season strong, attaining his first three games with over 300 yards passing in his professional career with wins over the New York Jets, Miami Dolphins, and Los Angeles Rams, with a high of 415 yards against Miami and a last-minute comeback win over Los Angeles. He became the first Bills quarterback to throw for 300 yards since Tyrod Taylor recorded 329 yards in Week 16 of the 2016 season, and also became the first Bills quarterback to pass for 300 yards in back-to-back games since Drew Bledsoe in 2002. Through the first two weeks, Allen joined Peyton Manning, Tom Brady, and Patrick Mahomes as the only four quarterbacks in NFL history with at least 700 yards passing, six touchdowns, and no interceptions through the first two weeks of a season. After week 3, he became the first quarterback in Bills' history with at least 300 pass yards and three touchdowns in three consecutive weeks and surpassed Jim Kelly's franchise record for most passing touchdowns in the team's first three games with ten. On October 1, 2020, Allen was named the AFC Offensive Player of the Month for his performance in September.

In Week 4, Allen won against the Las Vegas Raiders by a score of 30–23, throwing for 288 yards and two touchdowns, with another rushing touchdown. He led the Bills to their first 4–0 record since 2008. The following week, Allen and the Bills played the Tennessee Titans on Tuesday, October 13, with the game having been delayed due to a COVID-19 outbreak in the Titans' organization. This was just the second Tuesday night football game in 70 years. The Bills lost 42–16. Allen finished the game with 26 completions on 41 attempts, passing for 263 yards, two touchdowns, and two interceptions.

In Week 8, Allen led the Bills to a 24–21 victory over the New England Patriots, Buffalo's first home win against the Patriots since 2011 and Allen's first career win against the Patriots. The following week, he would become the first quarterback in the Super Bowl era with at least 400 passing yards, three passing touchdowns, zero interceptions and a passer rating of 130 in multiple games in a single season during Buffalo's 44–34 upset victory over the heavily favored Seattle Seahawks. Allen completed 31 of 38 (81.6 completion percentage) passes for 415 yards and three passing touchdowns, adding 14 yards and another touchdown on the ground. The Bills improved to 7–2 on the year for the first time since 1993. After the game, it was revealed by Bills head coach Sean McDermott that Allen had played one day after the death of his grandmother.

In Week 10, the Bills traveled west to play the Arizona Cardinals. In a shootout match, Allen completed 32 of 49 passes for 284 yards, 2 touchdowns, and 2 interceptions. He also rushed for 38 yards on 7 carries and caught a 12-yard touchdown pass from Isaiah McKenzie on a trick play. Allen's second touchdown pass to Stefon Diggs put the Bills up 30–26 with only 34 seconds left in the game, but the Bills lost after Cardinals quarterback Kyler Murray completed a Hail Mary pass to DeAndre Hopkins with just two seconds left. After the bye week, Allen had a quiet but effective game during a 27–17 Week 12 win over the Los Angeles Chargers, completing 18 of 24 passes for 157 yards, one touchdown, and one interception, in addition to 32 rushing yards, one rushing touchdown, and one fumble. Allen had another strong game the following week on Monday Night Football against the San Francisco 49ers, completing 32 of 40 attempts for 375 passing yards and four passing touchdowns in the 34–24 victory, also becoming the first quarterback in Buffalo's history to attempt 40 or more passes in a single game while completing at least 80% of his passes and joined Drew Brees as the only two quarterbacks in league history to have three games of 375 passing yards, 3+ passing touchdowns and a 130+ passer rating in a single season.

Allen broke Jim Kelly's franchise record for the most total touchdowns by a single player during a Week 14 win over the Pittsburgh Steelers on Sunday Night Football after passing for two touchdowns during the game. He finished the game with 238 yards, the two touchdowns, and an interception. The following week against the Denver Broncos, Allen helped the Bills clinch their first AFC East division title since 1995, six months before he was born. He finished the game with 359 yards passing and two passing touchdowns, in addition to 33 yards rushing and two scores on the ground, during the 48–19 Bills win. During a Week 16 rematch with the Patriots on Monday Night Football, Allen completed 27 of 36 attempts for 320 passing yards and 4 touchdowns, surpassing Kelly's franchise record for single-season passing touchdowns. By helping Buffalo win 38–9, Allen also allowed the Bills to sweep the Patriots for the first time since . Allen was named the AFC Offensive Player of the Month for his performance in December. Overall, Allen finished the 2020 season with 4,544 passing yards, 37 passing touchdowns, and ten interceptions to go along with 102 carries for 421 rushing yards and eight rushing touchdowns. He also significantly improved his completion percentage from being the lowest in his previous seasons to fourth overall at 69.2.

Throughout the season, Allen was named the AFC Offensive Player of the Week four times, namely for his performance in Week 2 against Miami, Week 9 against Seattle, week 13 against San Francisco, and Week 15 against Denver. He became the first player in franchise history to win the award at least three times in a single season. On December 21, 2020, Allen and four of his teammates were named to the 2021 Pro Bowl, which took place virtually due to the COVID-19 pandemic. He ultimately finished in second-place for MVP voting, receiving four votes, which was ahead of Mahomes but behind winner Aaron Rodgers.

2020–21 postseason
In the Wild Card Round against the Indianapolis Colts, Allen completed 26 of 35 passes for 324 yards, rushed for 54 yards, and had three total touchdowns as the Bills won 27–24 giving the Bills their first playoff win since 1995.

Facing Lamar Jackson and the number-one rushing offense and top-ten defense in the Baltimore Ravens in the Divisional Round, Allen and the Bills would find themselves on the right end of a defensive battle with a 17–3 win. Allen completed 62.2% of his passes for 206 yards and one touchdown with no turnovers.

The following week, Allen faced a rematch against the Kansas City Chiefs, whom the Bills faced in Week 6, in Buffalo's first AFC Championship appearance since 1993. He completed 28 of 48 pass attempts for 287 yards, two touchdowns, and an interception that was his first career pick in the redzone, in addition to rushing for 88 yards, as the Bills lost 38–24. A minor scuffle occurred after Allen was tackled by Chiefs defender Alex Okafor after a play was blown dead in the fourth quarter, in which the former responded by flicking the ball at Okafor's helmet. Okafor began to taunt Allen until Bills linemen Jon Feliciano and Dion Dawkins shoved Okafor onto the ground. All four players received offsetting unsportsmanlike conduct penalties.

2021 season

In May 2021, the Bills exercised the fifth-year option on Allen's rookie contract, tying him to the team through the 2022 season. On August 6, 2021, Allen signed a six-year contract extension worth up to $258 million with $150 million guaranteed that would through to the 2028 season.

Allen surpassed 10,000 career passing yards during a 35–0 shutout win against the Miami Dolphins in Week 2.

In Week 3, Allen and the Bills defeated the Washington Football Team 43–21, as Allen passed for 358 yards and scored five touchdowns. He became just the fourth player in NFL history to record multiple career games with at least 300 passing yards, four passing touchdowns, and a rushing touchdown. He also tied Jack Kemp's franchise record for most career rushing touchdowns by a quarterback with 26.

The Bills faced the Kansas City Chiefs at Arrowhead Stadium for a rematch of the previous year's AFC Championship game in Week 5. During the Bills' 38–20 win, Allen completed 15 of 26 passes for 315 yards and three touchdowns, amassing 21 yards per completion, a career-high and the highest by any NFL quarterback in the prior two seasons. He also rushed for 59 yards and a touchdown on 11 carries, including another hurdle over a defender to pick up a first down in the fourth quarter. The following week, the Bills faced the Tennessee Titans on Monday Night Football. Despite a strong performance, Allen was stopped short by the Titans' defensive line during a quarterback sneak on a critical 4th and 1 situation on the Titans 3 yard line in the final moments of the game, allowing Tennessee to win 34–31. His final stat line for the game was 353 passing yards, 3 touchdowns, and 1 interception along with 26 rushing yards. Allen's three touchdowns allowed him to pass Jim Kelly for the most touchdowns thrown by a Bills quarterback in his first four seasons with the team.

In a Week 8 rematch against Miami, Allen and the Bills offense started slow, but he accounted for two passing touchdowns and a rushing touchdown in the second half of a 26–11 win. The rushing touchdown gave Allen 28 for his career, tying Cam Newton's record for the most rushing touchdowns in a quarterback's first 50 starts. In a 6–9 loss to the Jacksonville Jaguars the following week, Allen was held without a touchdown for the first time in the season, in addition to being sacked and intercepted by Jaguars defensive end Josh Allen. Both the sack and interception were the first to be performed by an NFL defensive player on an opposing quarterback of the same name.

After several up-and-down performances, including a Monday Night Bills loss to the New England Patriots in Week 13 where the passing game was limited by high-velocity winds, Allen helped the team overcome a 24–3 halftime deficit to the Tampa Bay Buccaneers in Week 14, rallying Buffalo to 24 second-half points to force overtime. They would go on to lose 33–27, however. Despite the loss, Allen became just the fourth player in NFL history with over 300 passing yards and 100 rushing yards in a game. During a Week 16 rematch with the Patriots, Allen passed for 312 yards, three touchdowns, and ran for 65 yards as the Bills won 33–21. He also surpassed 4,000 passing yards on the season, becoming the first Bills quarterback with multiple 4,000 yard passing seasons.

Against the Atlanta Falcons in Week 17, Allen threw for a career-high three interceptions and had a career-low passer rating of 17, but rushed for 81 yards and two touchdowns on the ground as Buffalo relied on its running game to win 29–15 and clinched its fourth playoff berth in five seasons. The two rushing touchdowns gave Allen six on the year, making him the first quarterback in NFL history to rush for at least six touchdowns in his first four seasons. Allen and the Bills finished the regular season with a 27–10 victory over the New York Jets, securing the AFC East division title for a second consecutive season. He finished the game with 239 passing yards, 63 rushing yards, and two passing touchdowns.

Allen finished the regular season with a career-high 409 pass completions, completing 63.3 percent of his passes for 4,407 passing yards, 36 passing touchdowns and a 92.2 passer rating. He also had 763 rushing yards and another six touchdowns on the ground, leading the league in yards per carry at 6.3. For his play, he was named a Pro Bowl alternate, losing out to Lamar Jackson for the final quarterback spot on the initial Pro Bowl roster, much to the chagrin of fans and analysts. When offered Jackson's spot after he pulled out, Allen declined the invitation.

2021–22 postseason

In the Wild Card Game against the Patriots, the Bills scored a touchdown on every offensive possession they had the ball aside from the final kneeldowns as they won 47–17, attaining the first "perfect offensive game" in NFL history. Allen completed 21 of 25 passes for 308 yards and five touchdowns in addition to rushing for 66 yards, passing for more touchdowns than incompletions during the game. In the Divisional Round, Buffalo rematched against the Kansas City Chiefs, whom they previously lost to in last year's AFC Championship Game. During the final two minutes of the tightly contested game, Allen threw two go-ahead touchdowns to Gabe Davis as the Bills and Chiefs exchanged leads three times before Kansas City tied the game at 36 apiece and forced overtime. The Chiefs won 42–36 in the extra period after winning the coin toss and scoring on the opening drive as Allen and the Bills offense never touched the ball. Despite the loss, Allen kept pace with Chiefs quarterback Patrick Mahomes, completing 27 of 37 passes for 329 yards and four touchdowns, all to Davis. He also rushed for 68 yards. His postseason passer rating of 149.0 is the highest ever in a single postseason, breaking the previous record of 146.4 held by Joe Montana in 1989.

2022 season

Against the Los Angeles Rams in the NFL Kickoff Game, Allen completed 26 of 31 passes for 297 yards, three touchdowns, two interceptions, and rushed for 56 yards and a rushing touchdown in the 31–10 win.
During Monday Night Football against the Tennessee Titans in Week 2, Allen completed 26 of 38 passes for 317 yards, 4 touchdowns, and no interceptions, he also rushed for 10 yards in the 41–7 win. During Week 3 against the Miami Dolphins, Allen finished with 400 passing yards, two touchdowns, and three fumbles (one lost). A game winning drive came off line and the Bills lost 19–21. After opening up to a 20–3 deficit against the Baltimore Ravens in Week 4, the Bills rallied to come back and win the game 23–20 after their defense held the Ravens scoreless in the second half and Tyler Bass kicked a walk-off field goal. Allen passed for 213 yards, one passing touchdown, one interception, and 70 rushing yards with one rushing touchdown on 11 carries. In Week 5, Allen passed for 424 yards, four touchdowns, and one interception in the 38–3 victory over the Pittsburgh Steelers. The first of Allen's touchdowns was a 98-yard pass to Gabriel Davis toward the beginning of the game. The play tied the record for longest pass play in franchise history. In a rematch of the previous season's Divisional Round game, Allen had 329 passing yards and three touchdowns in the 24–20 come-from-behind victory over the Kansas City Chiefs.

Following the bye week, Allen threw for 218 yards, two touchdown passes, and two interceptions in a 27–17 victory against the Green Bay Packers on Sunday Night Football. In Week 9 against the New York Jets, Allen ran for 2 touchdowns and completed 18 passes of 34 attempts for 205 yards and two interceptions in a 17–20 defeat. In that game, Allen suffered an elbow injury similar to one suffered during his rookie season, but was able to start the next week against the Minnesota Vikings, where he threw for 330 yards and a touchdown, but threw two interceptions, including the game-losing interception to Patrick Peterson in the red-zone in the 33–30 overtime loss.

Partly owing to Allen's lingering elbow injury, the Bills opted to rely more on the run game in the following games against the Cleveland Browns, Detroit Lions, and New England Patriots, all wins. Against Detroit on Thanksgiving Day, Allen led the Bills to a comeback win with a strong fourth quarter performance, including a touchdown to retake the lead and a 36-yard pass to Stefon Diggs that helped set up the game-winning field goal. He finished the game with 253 passing yards, two passing touchdowns, and one interception while rushing for 78 yards and a rushing touchdown.

During the Bills' week 15 primetime matchup against the Miami Dolphins, Allen and the Bills found themselves down 29–21 with 12 minutes remaining in the game. Allen would then lead Buffalo on a 7-play drive, that included a season-long 44-yard run, and was capped off by a Dawson Knox touchdown catch and a successful two-point conversion to tie the game at 29–29. After the defense forced a Miami punt, the Bills would get the ball back at their own seven yard line with six minutes remaining. Allen would lead Buffalo on a 15-play drive that ended with a Tyler Bass game-winning field goal as time expired. Allen went 25-40 with 304 passing yards, four passing touchdowns and 77 rushing yards in the 32–29 win.

In 16 games, with the game against the Cincinnati Bengals declared a no-contest due to a life-threatening injury to Bills safety Damar Hamlin, Allen compiled his third straight season with over 4,000 passing yards, 35 or more passing touchdowns, and 6 or more rushing touchdowns while leading Buffalo to its third consecutive AFC East division title. He was named to the 2023 Pro Bowl Games on the AFC's initial roster.

NFL career statistics

Regular season

Postseason

Records and achievements

NFL records
First quarterback to rush for at least 95 yards in three consecutive games (Week 12–14, 2018)
First quarterback with 10 passing touchdowns and 2 rushing touchdowns through three weeks (Week 1–3, 2020)
First quarterback with 375+ pass yards, 3+ pass touchdowns, 0 interceptions and a 130+ QB rating in multiple games in a single season (Week 2, 9 & 13, 2020)
Most rushing touchdowns by a quarterback, first 50 starts: 28 (tied with Cam Newton)
First quarterback in history with at least 100 touchdown passes and 30 rushing touchdowns in first four seasons (2021)
First quarterback to have 300 passing yards, 60 rushing yards, and five touchdowns passes in a playoff game (2022)
Highest passer rating in a single postseason: 149.0 (2022)
First quarterback in history to have at least 30 passing touchdowns, 5 rushing touchdowns and 1 touchdown reception in a season (2020)
First quarterback in history to score on every offensive possession (7 possessions and 7 touchdowns) in this same game no punts, no turnovers and no field goals occurred for the Bills which also has never happened in the NFL regular season or playoffs. (Wildcard playoff game vs Patriots, January 15, 2022)
First player in history to have three seasons with at least 25 passing touchdowns and 5 rushing touchdowns. (Achieved December 1, 2022)
First quarterback in history to have five consecutive seasons with six or more rushing touchdowns. (Achieved December 11, 2022)

Bills franchise records
 Most rushing yards by a quarterback in a single game: 135
 Longest touchdown pass by a rookie quarterback: 75 yards
 Most rushing yards by a quarterback in a single season: 763
 Most total touchdowns by a rookie: 18
 Most consecutive games by a quarterback scoring at least one touchdown: 21 
 Most rushing touchdowns by a quarterback in a single season: 9 (2019)
 Most rushing yards by a quarterback in a single game, post-season: 92 (January 4, 2020, vs. Houston Texans)
 Most consecutive games with over 300 passing yards: 3 (shared with Jim Kelly, week 1–3, 2020)
 Most games with 300 passing yards and 4 TDs, single season: 4 (2020)
 Most total touchdowns in a season: 46 (2020)
 Most passing touchdowns, single season: 37 (2020)
 Most passing yards, single season: 4,544 (2020)
First Bills quarterback with multiple 4,000 passing yard seasons (2020, 2021, 2022)
 Most rushing yards by a Bills quarterback, career: 3,087
 Most rushing touchdowns by a Bills quarterback, career: 38
Most touchdowns thrown in a single playoff game by a Bills quarterback: 5 (2022)
Longest touchdown pass by a Bills player: 98 yards (shared with Ryan Fitzpatrick, October 9, 2022, vs. Pittsburgh Steelers)

Accolades
 Second-team All-Pro (2020)
 2× Pro Bowl (2020, 2022)
 PFWA Most Improved Player (2020)
 2× AFC Offensive Player of the Month (2020: September, December)
 10× AFC Offensive Player of the Week (2018: Week 17; 2019: Week 11; 2020: Week 2, 9, 13, 15; 2021: Week 3; 2022: Week 5, 6, 15)
 87th-ranked player on NFL Top 100 (2020)
 10th-ranked player on NFL Top 100 (2021)
 13th-ranked player on NFL Top 100 (2022)
 2× FedEx Air Player of the Week (2022: Week 5, 18)

Player profile
Allen has received praise for his unique combination of size, arm strength, athleticism, mental toughness, and leadership skills, drawing comparisons to John Elway, Brett Favre, Ben Roethlisberger, and Cam Newton. He was highly sought after in the NFL draft for his "raw potential" despite criticism of his consistency and accuracy coming out of college.

Allen appeared on an episode of Sport Science prior to the 2018 NFL Draft. As part of the show, Allen was equipped with sensors on his body to record his movements. In a Load to Arrival test, which measures the load time and velocity from hand separation to arrival, Allen's throwing motion takes an average of 0.38 seconds. This timing is on par with Tom Brady and Aaron Rodgers. Allen's fingertip speed, which indicates ball speed, averages 74.3 mph. This is the fastest launch velocity Sport Science ever recorded on their show. In the movement pass test, which measures an ability to throw on the run, Allen's release speed was 58 mph. Despite criticism of his accuracy, when given one chance to hit a soccer goal crossbar from 35 yards away, Allen hit the crossbar. Allen was the only 2018 quarterback prospect tested that hit the crossbar. Brenkus later stated in an interview that Allen's college completion percentage was a misleading statistic, citing Brett Favre's 52% completion percentage in college as an example.

Allen is a self-identified gunslinger, attempting and completing difficult passes but sometimes taking unnecessary risks. However, his work ethic and training under former offensive coordinator Brian Daboll, current offensive coordinator Ken Dorsey, and throwing coach Jordan Palmer have been cited as instrumental in his development into a more accurate and methodical passer.

His scrambling and rushing abilities have also been cited as key strengths, especially given his large size, which makes it difficult for defenders to tackle him. Despite a poor offensive line in his rookie year, Allen was able to elude and break tackles to keep plays alive or gain significant yardage on the ground, keeping an otherwise ineffective Buffalo offense moving. He has also been noted for his ability to leap over defenders, often in dramatic fashion, to keep offensive drives alive.

Personal life

Allen is in a relationship with former Fresno State Bulldogs cheerleader and current Pilates instructor Brittany Williams, with whom he grew up in central California. They first met at 8 years old before later reconnecting in high school. They have been in a relationship since 2015.

In December 2017, Allen graduated from the University of Wyoming with a bachelor's degree in social science.

Allen is friends with San Francisco 49ers quarterback Sam Darnold and current teammate Kyle Allen (no relation); the trio often trains and vacations together in the offseason.

He is a fan of adult standards and oldies music, which he says keeps him calm before games. His pregame playlist includes entries by Frank Sinatra ("That's Life"), Sammy Davis Jr., Elvis Presley, Paul Anka ("Put Your Head on My Shoulder"), and Billy Joel ("The Stranger").

Allen was raised in the United Methodist Church but had largely lapsed in his religious observances in adulthood. He experienced a spiritual awakening following the collapse and later recovery of his teammate Damar Hamlin.

Golf
Allen is an avid golfer, which he says is one of his favorite activities. He declined an invitation to the 2022 Pro Bowl as an alternate to play in the 2022 AT&T Pebble Beach Pro-Am, finishing 55th out of a field of 156 pairs in a pairing with Keith Mitchell. He again declined to appear in the 2023 Pro Bowl Games for similar reasons. Allen participated in the sixth edition of The Match as part of a tandem with Patrick Mahomes, against Tom Brady and Aaron Rodgers, on June 1, 2022. They lost on a match-winning putt by Rodgers.

Allen's home in Buffalo, NY has a par-3 course, a separate green with six holes, three different tee boxes, and a full swing simulator. His handicap as of 2022 is 8, and his all-time best score is 77.

Business ventures
Allen is represented by Creative Artists Agency. From the beginning of Allen's professional career, he has been a Nike, Inc. athlete and has stated that, "It was a dream of mine to be a Nike athlete, seeing commercials of Kobe Bryant and being a West Coast kid and seeing all the deals that he had with Nike and all the shoes that he released. When I was coming out, it didn't really matter who else made offers. If another company was wanting to give me more money, it didn't matter. I was going to go Nike".

Allen is one of eight NFL ambassadors for New Era Cap Company, an American headwear company headquartered in Buffalo, New York. Allen worked with New Era's creative team to design a special-edition cap released and sold in October 2019 to benefit Oishei Children's Hospital in Buffalo. In July 2020, Allen was announced as a shareholder in OnCore Golf Technology, Inc., a golf ball manufacturer and golf entertainment company founded and based in Buffalo, New York.

Following in Jim Kelly and Doug Flutie's footsteps, Allen partnered with PLB Sports & Entertainment and Wegmans in September 2020 to produce his own cereal, Josh's Jaqs. Like "Flutie Flakes" and "Kelly Krunch" before it, "Josh's Jaqs" featured the image of the Bills' quarterback throwing a football on a blue box that shows the red and blue, team-colored cereal Os. Proceeds from "Josh's Jaqs" went to the Oishei Children's Hospital.

Allen is a fourth-generation farmer and has invested in his family's farm, the Allen Ranch, to plant and cultivate  of pistachio trees over the next decade. A brand name for the pistachios is still under consideration, though Allen has joked that he could call them "Josh's Nuts".

Philanthropy
Allen is a spokesperson for the John R. Oishei Children's Hospital in Buffalo. As part of a deal with the hospital, Allen makes appearances, visits patients, and is in commercials to support fundraising efforts. During the 2019 season, Allen donated $200 to the hospital for each of his touchdowns. He scored 29 total touchdowns in the 2019 season, resulting in a total donation of $5,800 to the hospital. Allen has a personal connection to children's health because his younger brother, Jason, was hospitalized for a few days as a child with Kawasaki disease, a rare condition which inflames blood vessels. After Allen played a game following the death of his grandmother, Patricia, Bills fans gratefully donated in $17 increments (17 being Allen's jersey number) to the hospital in her memory. By the end of 2020, the total amount donated had exceeded $1 million. On November 21, 2020, Oishei Children's Hospital announced that they would be naming a new wing on the 10th floor as the "Patricia Allen Pediatric Recovery Wing" to honor the donations received by the Bills fans. Allen and his family then consulted with the hospital to establish the "Patricia Allen Fund".

Prior to this, Allen considered starting a foundation but instead decided to support existing organizations, including the Fresno, California chapter of the Leukemia & Lymphoma Society, where his sister works in fundraising, and the Jessie Rees Foundation, which supports children fighting cancer. Allen wears a blue "NEGU" (Never Ever Give Up) bracelet from the foundation. In March 2020, Allen donated $25,000 to the Terry and Kim Pegula Western New York COVID-19 Community Response Fund. Allen also matched $10,000 in donations to Kaleida Health's COVID-19 Response Fund.

References

External links

 
Buffalo Bills bio
Wyoming Cowboys bio

1996 births
Living people
American Conference Pro Bowl players
American football quarterbacks
American people of Swedish descent
Buffalo Bills players
Players of American football from California
Reedley Tigers football players
Sportspeople from Fresno County, California
Wyoming Cowboys football players